Medan Hokkien is a local variety of Hokkien spoken among Chinese Indonesians in Medan and Jakarta, Indonesia. It is the lingua franca in Medan as well as other northern city states of North Sumatra surrounding it, and is a subdialect of the Zhangzhou (漳州) dialects, together with widespread use of Indonesian and English borrowed words. It is predominantly a spoken dialect: it is rarely written in Chinese characters as Indonesia had banned the use of Chinese characters back in New Order era.

Comparing Medan Hokkien to other Hokkien dialects in countries such as Malaysia and Singapore, Medan Hokkien is still understandable to a certain extent. Medan Hokkien speakers may have a similar accent as Malaysian and Singaporean speakers. The closest comparison to Medan Hokkien is Penang Hokkien. Both are so similar that it is hard to tell the difference between the two if the Medan Hokkien speaker does not mix Indonesian language borrowings in their conversation.

See also
 Hoklo people
 Hokkien culture
 Hokkien architecture
 Written Hokkien
 Hokkien media
 Taiwanese Hokkien
 Singapore Hokkien
 Penang Hokkien
 Southern Malaysia Hokkien
 Philippine Hokkien
 Holopedia
 Speak Hokkien Campaign

External links
Medan & Penang Hokkien Podcast 

Languages of Indonesia
Hokkien-language dialects